Extravaganza is the fourth album by the British rock group Stackridge.  The album was produced by Tony Ashton at AIR Studios, London.  The band experienced a significant lineup change after its previous album, with James Warren, James "Crun" Walter and Billy Sparkle all leaving.

The album was originally released in the UK on Elton John's label, The Rocket Record Company.  Stackridge was the first group signed to the new label.

A different version of the album was released by Sire Records in the U.S and Canada.  This version removed two songs already released on Pinafore Days and added "Do The Stanley" from a UK single and "The Indifferent Hedgehog" from the UK album The Man In The Bowler Hat.

Singer and songwriter Gordon Haskell rehearsed with Stackridge for a short time during 1974.  Though Haskell decided not to join Stackridge the group recorded one of his songs. Originally called "Worms", the version on Extravaganza was re-titled "No One's More Important Than the Earthworm".

The song "Happy In The Lord", written by Phil Welton, was a cover of a song originally performed by the band Fat Grapple, and released by them as a single in 1975.

Track listing

Side one
"Spin 'Round the Room" (Rod Bowkett, Lucy Vernon) – 2:45
"Grease Paint Smiles" (Bowkett, Bathos) – 4:04
"The Volunteer" (Andy Davis, Smegmakovitch) – 5:05
"Highbury Incident (Rainy July Morning)" (Davis, Bowkett, "Mutter" Slater) – 4:02
"Benjamin's Giant Onion" (Bowkett, Bathos) – 4:04
"Happy in the Lord" (Phil Welton) – 3:51

Side two
"Rufus T. Firefly" (Bowkett) – 4:51
"No One's More Important Than the Earthworm" (Gordon Haskell) – 5:12
"Pocket Billiards" (Bowkett) – 4:04
"Who's That Up There with Bill Stokes?" (Bowkett, Davis) – 4:36

Track listing: U.S. version, Sire Records SASD-7509
"The Volunteer" (Davis, Smegmakovitch) – 5:05
"Rufus T. Firefly" (Bowkett) – 4:51
"No One's More Important Than the Earthworm" (Haskell) – 5:12
"Grease Paint Smiles" (Bowkett, Bathos) – 4:04
"Happy in the Lord" (Phil Welton) – 3:51
"Benjamin's Giant Onion" (Bowkett, Bathos) – 4:04
"Pocket Billiards" (Bowkett) – 4:04
"The Indifferent Hedgehog" (Davis, Graham Smith) – 3:15
"Do the Stanley" (Wabadaw Sleeve) – 2:53
"Who's That Up There with Bill Stokes?" (Bowkett, Davis) – 4:36

Note that "Bathos", "Smegmaokovitch" and "Wabadaw Sleeve" are entities invented by the band to signify the whole band. Many lyrics were joint efforts.

Personnel
Andy Davis (Andy Cresswell-Davis) – guitar, mellotron, vocals
Michael Evans - violin
Michael "Mutter" Slater - flute, vocals
Keith Gemmell - saxophones, clarinet, flute
Paul Karas - bass, vocals
Rod Bowkett - keyboards
Roy Morgan - drums

Production
Produced by Tony Ashton and Stackridge
Engineers: Geoff Emerick, Pete Swettenham, Gary Edwards
Recorded at AIR Studios, London, England 1974
Remastered under the watchful eye of Andy Davis and James Warren at Sundried Artists by Glenn Tommey during November 2006.

References

Stackridge albums
1975 albums
The Rocket Record Company albums
Albums recorded at AIR Studios